The Independent University of Moscow (IUM) is an educational organisation with rather informal status located in Moscow, Russia. It was founded in 1991 by a group of prominent Russian mathematicians that included Vladimir Arnold (chairman) and Sergei Novikov. The IUM consists of the departments of mathematics and theoretical physics and the post-graduate school. Anyone can attend lectures and seminars and become a student after passing three exams. The IUM is the only non-state college for the preparation of professional mathematicians in Russia . 

It is a non-governmental educational institution for the training of professional mathematicians, acting by a higher education institution type.

Location

The IUM is located in a building in central Moscow. The address is 11 Bol. Vlasievskii per., a small street near the historic Arbat and within walking distance of the Kremlin, the Bolshoi Theater, the Russian State Library, the Pushkin Museum, and the Cathedral of Christ the Savior.

In addition to lecture halls and classes, the IUM building has a library, a computer lab, a cafeteria, a small publishing house, and a book shop for math books.  During the day, some of its classrooms are devoted to educating children with disabilities.

IUM is the home of the Math in Moscow study abroad program, a one-semester course in mathematics and computer science. Students from the United States and Canada are eligible for the program, and courses are taught in English by Russian mathematicians.  The American Mathematical Society offers several scholarships each semester to help cover tuition.

History 
The Independent University of Moscow was founded in 1991 by a group of prominent academics, professors and mathematics teaching enthusiasts (V.I. Arnold, S.P. Novikov, Y.G.Sinai, L.D. Faddeev, V.M. Tikhomirov, R.L . Dobrušin, and others). P. Deligne and R. MacPherson also played decisive roles in the creation of the university, along with N.N. Konstantinov, the famous teacher and organizer of mathematical olympiads. Since 2000, Yulij Ilyashenko has served as the president of the IUM.

Since 2001, the IUM operates a program for foreign students called Math in Moscow. The American and Canadian Mathematical Societies award scholarships for those wishing for a year or a semester to study mathematics at the IUM. The IUM also operates an exchange program with the Ecole Normale Supérieure in Paris and fifth-year graduate students have the opportunity to IUM for a month to study at Ecole Normale, and French students at IUM. In 2002, it opened a joint French-Russian Laboratory (Laboratoire J.-V. Poncelet).

Training 
IUM is a structural subdivision of the Moscow Center for Continuous Mathematical Education. Training is conducted on the basis of Annexes 001 to 335 085 series A license, registration number 026325, as the provision of additional educational programs (electives) to secondary or higher education.

IUM offers a free 5-year course of study (student has the right to reduce or increase the actual period of study, based on your personal needs and interests), and (since 1993), post-graduate courses. Classes are held in the evenings for the convenience of students of high schools.

Education in the IUM is based on the following principles:
 There are no entrance exams.
 Any person can freely attend the classes.
 A non-resident student who successfully passes three exams, becomes a resident student of the university. A resident student must pass at least 3k - 3 courses to complete k-th semester.
 To graduate, the student must fulfill all the credits, both for the mandatory and elective courses, and defend a thesis.

External links
 IUM Site in Russian, in English
 Math in Moscow official website

Further reading
AMS Notices V.44 Number 4, The Independent University of Moscow in Its New Quarters, A. B. Sossinsky. (1997)

Educational institutions established in 1991
Independent University of Moscow
1991 establishments in Russia